Blanco y Negro (English: Black and White) is the fourth studio album by Mexican-American cumbia group A.B. Quintanilla y Los Kumbia All Starz and the eighth studio album by Mexican-American musician A.B. Quintanilla. It was released on September 17, 2013 by Universal Music Latin and Siente Music. It was originally set to be released on February 12, 2013 by Capitol Latin.

Track listing

Charts

References

2013 albums
Kumbia All Starz albums
A. B. Quintanilla albums
Albums produced by A.B. Quintanilla
Universal Music Latino albums
Spanish-language albums
Cumbia albums
Albums recorded at Q-Productions